Abraham van Cuylenborch or Cuylenberg; Cuylenburgh (1620 – 1658) was a Dutch Golden Age landscape painter.

Cuylenborch was born in Utrecht and is known for landscapes with grottoes, in the manner of Cornelis van Poelenburgh.

Cuylenborch died in Utrecht.

Works
 A tomb in a Grotto, oil on panel, 41 x 33.6 cm, 1641, Glasgow Museums
 Landscape with Bacchus and the nymphs, oil on panel, 58 x 72 cm, c. 1645, Metropolitan Museum of Art
 Grotto with figures, oil on panel, 32.6 x 40.3 cm, 1645–1650, Fitzwilliam Museum
 Diana bathing, oil on panel, 59 x 70 cm, 1646, Galleria Borghese

References

 Cuylenborch, Abraham van (1610? - 1658) in the artist list of the National Museum of Sweden

Artists from Utrecht
Dutch Golden Age painters
Dutch male painters
1620 births
1658 deaths